Covello is an unincorporated community in Columbia County, in the U.S. state of Washington.

History
Covello was named in 1882 when a country store opened at the town site.  A post office called Covello was established in 1883, and remained in operation until 1918.

References

Unincorporated communities in Columbia County, Washington
Unincorporated communities in Washington (state)